Lower Silesian Forest is the largest continuous forest of Poland, with total area of 1650 square kilometers. It is located in southwestern Poland, in the Lower Silesian Voivodeship and the Lubusz Voivodeship, near border with Germany. Western boundary of the forest is made by the Nysa Łużycka, behind which spreads a German forest, Muskauer Heide. It is mostly covered by pine trees. 

The area of the Lower Silesian Forest is predominantly flat, with the biggest point, the hill called Dębniak measuring only 238 meters above sea level. The wilderness is subdivided into several smaller forests, and it is crossed by a number of rivers, including the Kwisa, the Bóbr, and the Szprotawa. Among most important urban centers in this region are Bolesławiec, Węgliniec, Żagań, Żary, Szprotawa, and Pieńsk. 

The Lower Silesian Forest is very popular among hunters, as it is rich in such animals as deer, wild pigs, hares, foxes, and wolves.

Gallery

See also 
 Silesia Walls

Forests of Poland
Geography of Lubusz Voivodeship
Geography of Lower Silesian Voivodeship
Tourist attractions in Lower Silesian Voivodeship
Lower Silesia